Hello Herbie is an album by pianist Oscar Peterson and his trio, joined by guitarist Herb Ellis.

Track listing
 "Naptown Blues" (Wes Montgomery) – 5:20
 "Exactly Like You" (Dorothy Fields, Jimmy McHugh) – 4:50
 "Seven Come Eleven" (Charlie Christian, Benny Goodman, Fletcher Henderson) – 5:06
 "Hamp's Blues" (Hampton Hawes) – 3:46
 "Blues for H.G." (Oscar Peterson) – 6:05
 "A Lovely Way to Spend an Evening" (Harold Adamson, McHugh) – 8:23
 "Day by Day" (Sammy Cahn, Axel Stordahl, Paul Weston) – 4:44

Personnel
Oscar Peterson – piano
Herb Ellis – guitar
Sam Jones – double bass
Bobby Durham – drums

Production
 Hans Georg Brunner-Schwer – producer

References

1969 albums
Oscar Peterson albums
MPS Records albums
Pausa Records albums
Herb Ellis albums